South Pier may refer to:
South Pier, Blackpool, a pier in Blackpool, England
South Pier, Lowestoft, a pier in Lowestoft, Suffolk
South Pier, Penzance, a pier in Penzance, Cornwall, England
Charlevoix South Pier Light Station, a lighthouse in Charlevoix, Michigan, U.S.
Gorleston South Pier Lighthouse, a coastwatch station in Gorleston, England

See also
Marina South Pier, a pier in Marina South, Singapore
Marina South Pier MRT station, a proposed massive transit station at Marina South Pier
South Parade Pier, in Portsmouth, England